Flightless birds are birds that through evolution lost the ability to fly. There are over 60 extant species, including the well known ratites (ostriches, emu, cassowaries, rheas, and kiwi) and penguins. The smallest flightless bird is the Inaccessible Island rail (length 12.5 cm, weight 34.7 g). The largest (both heaviest and tallest) flightless bird, which is also the largest living bird, is the ostrich (2.7 m, 156 kg).

Many domesticated birds, such as the domestic chicken and domestic duck, have lost the ability to fly for extended periods, although their ancestral species, the red junglefowl and mallard, respectively, are capable of extended flight. A few particularly bred birds, such as the Broad Breasted White turkey, have become totally flightless as a result of selective breeding; the birds were bred to grow massive breast meat that weighs too much for the bird's wings to support in flight.

Flightlessness has evolved in many different birds independently, demonstrating repeated convergent evolution. There were families of flightless birds, such as the now extinct Phorusrhacidae, that evolved to be powerful terrestrial predators. Taking this to a greater extreme, the terror birds (and their relatives the bathornithids), eogruids, geranoidids, gastornithiforms, and dromornithids (all extinct) all evolved similar body shapes – long legs, long necks and big heads – but none of them were closely related. Furthermore, they also share traits of being giant, flightless birds with vestigial wings, long legs, and long necks with some of the ratites, although they are not related.

History

Origins of flightlessness
Divergences and losses of flight within ratite lineage occurred right after the K-Pg extinction event wiped out all non-avian dinosaurs and large vertebrates 66 million years ago. The immediate evacuation of niches following the mass extinction provided opportunities for Palaeognathes to distribute and occupy novel environments. New ecological influences selectively pressured different taxa to converge on flightless modes of existence by altering them morphologically and behaviorally. The successful acquisition and protection of a claimed territory selected for large size and cursoriality in Tertiary ancestors of ratites. Temperate rainforests dried out throughout the Miocene and transformed into semiarid deserts, causing habitats to be widely spread across the growingly disparate landmasses. Cursoriality was an economic means of traveling long distances to acquire food that was usually low-lying vegetation, more easily accessed by walking. Traces of these events are reflected in ratite distribution throughout semiarid grasslands and deserts today.

Gigantism and flightlessness in birds are almost exclusively correlated due to islands lacking mammalian or reptilian predators and competition. However, ratites occupy environments that are mostly occupied by a diverse number of mammals. It is thought that they first originated through allopatric speciation caused by breakup of the supercontinent Gondwana. However, later evidence suggests this hypothesis first proposed by Joel Cracraft in 1974 is incorrect. Rather ratites arrived in their respective locations via a flighted ancestor and lost the ability to fly multiple times within the lineage.

Gigantism is not a requirement for flightlessness. The kiwi do not exhibit gigantism, along with tinamous, even though they coexisted with the moa and rheas that both exhibit gigantism. This could be the result of different ancestral flighted birds arrival or because of competitive exclusion. The first flightless bird to arrive in each environment utilized the large flightless herbivore or omnivore niche, forcing the later arrivals to remain smaller. In environments where flightless birds are not present, it is possible that after the K/T Boundary there were no niches for them to fill. They were pushed out by other herbivorous mammals.

New Zealand had more species of flightless birds (including the kiwi, several species of penguins, the takahē, the weka, the moa, and several other extinct species) than any other such location. One reason is that until the arrival of humans roughly a thousand years ago, there were no large land predators in New Zealand; the main predators of flightless birds were larger birds.

Independent evolution of flightlessness in Palaeognathes
Ratites belong to the superorder Palaeognathae, which include the volant tinamou, and are believed to have evolved flightlessness independently multiple times within their own group. Some birds evolved flightlessness in response to the absence of predators, for example on oceanic islands. Incongruences between ratite phylogeny and Gondwana geological history indicate the presence of ratites in their current locations is the result of a secondary invasion by flying birds. It remains possible that the most recent common ancestor of ratites was flightless and the tinamou regained the ability to fly. However, it is believed that the loss of flight is an easier transition for birds than the loss and regain of flight, which has never been documented in avian history. Moreover, tinamou nesting within flightless ratites indicates ancestral ratites were volant and multiple losses of flight occurred independently throughout the lineage. This indicates that the distinctive flightless nature of ratites is the result of convergent evolution.

Morphological changes and energy conservation
Two key differences between flying and flightless birds are the smaller wing bones of flightless birds and the absent (or greatly reduced) keel on their breastbone.  (The keel anchors muscles needed for wing movement.)

Adapting to a cursorial lifestyle causes two inverse morphological changes to occur in the skeleto-muscular system: the pectoral apparatus used to power flight is paedorphically reduced while peramorphosis leads to enlargement of the pelvic girdle for running. Repeated selection for cursorial traits across ratites suggests these adaptions comprise a more efficient use of energy in adulthood. The name "ratite" comes from the Latin ratis, raft, a vessel with no keel. Their flat sternum is distinct from the typical sternum of flighted birds because it lacks a keel, like a raft. This structure is the place where flight muscles attach and thus allow for powered flight. However, ratite anatomy presents other primitive characters meant for flight, such as the fusion of wing elements, a cerebellar structure, the presence of a pygostyle for tail feathers, and an alula on the wing. These morphological traits suggest some affinities to volant groups. Palaeognathes were one of the first colonizers of novel niches and were free to increase in abundance until the population was limited by food and territory. A study looking at energy conservation and the evolution of flightlessness hypothesized intraspecific competition selected for a reduced individual energy expenditure, which is achieved by the loss of flight.

Some flightless varieties of island birds are closely related to flying varieties, implying flight is a significant biological cost. Flight is the most costly type of locomotion exemplified in the natural world. The energy expenditure required for flight increases proportionally with body size, which is often why flightlessness coincides with body mass. By reducing large pectoral muscles that require a significant amount of overall metabolic energy, ratites decrease their basal metabolic rate and conserve energy. A study looking at the basal rates of birds found a significant correlation between low basal rate and pectoral muscle mass in kiwis. On the contrary, flightless penguins exhibit an intermediate basal rate. This is likely because penguins have well-developed pectoral muscles for hunting and diving in the water. For ground feeding birds, a cursorial lifestyle is more economical and allows for easier access to dietary requirements. Flying birds have different wing and feather structures that make flying easier, while flightless birds' wing structures are well adapted to their environment and activities, such as diving in the ocean.

Species with certain characteristics are more likely to evolve flightlessness. For example, species that already have shorter wings are more likely to lose flight ability. Additionally, birds that undergo simultaneous wing molt, in which they replace all of the feathers in their wings at once during the year, are more likely to evolve flight loss.

A number of bird species appear to be in the process of losing their powers of flight to various extents. These include the Zapata rail of Cuba, the Okinawa rail of Japan, and the Laysan duck of Hawaii. All of these birds show adaptations common to flightlessness, and evolved recently from fully flighted ancestors, but have not yet completely given up the ability to fly. They are, however, weak fliers and are incapable of traveling long distances by air.

Continued presence of wings in flightless birds
Although selection pressure for flight was largely absent, the wing structure has not been lost except in the New Zealand moas. Ostriches are the fastest running birds in the world and emus have been documented running 50 km/h. At these high speeds, wings are necessary for balance and serving as a parachute apparatus to help the bird slow down. Wings are hypothesized to have played a role in sexual selection in early ancestral ratites and were thus maintained. This can be seen today in both the rheas and ostriches. These ratites utilize their wings extensively for courtship and displays to other males. Sexual selection also influences the maintenance of large body size, which discourages flight. The large size of ratites leads to greater access to mates and higher reproductive success. Ratites and tinamous are monogamous and mate only a limited number of times per year. High parental involvement denotes the necessity for choosing a reliable mate. In a climatically stable habitat providing year round food supply, a male's claimed territory signals to females the abundance of resources readily available to her and her offspring. Male size also indicates his protective abilities. Similar to the emperor penguin, male ratites incubate and protect their offspring anywhere between 85 and 92 days while females feed. They can go up to a week without eating and survive only off fat stores. The emu has been documented fasting as long as 56 days. If no continued pressures warrant the energy expenditure to maintain the structures of flight, selection will tend towards these other traits.

The only known species of flightless bird in which wings completely disappeared was the gigantic, herbivorous moa of New Zealand, hunted to extinction by humans by the 15th century. In moa, the entire pectoral girdle is reduced to a paired scapulocoracoid, which is the size of a finger.

List of flightless birds
Many flightless birds are extinct; this list shows species that are either still extant, or became extinct in the Holocene (no more than 11,000 years ago). Extinct species are indicated with a cross (†). A number of species suspected, but not confirmed to be flightless, are also included here.

Longer-extinct groups of flightless birds include the Cretaceous patagopterygiformes, hesperornithids, the Cenozoic phorusrhacids ("terror birds") and related bathornithids, the unrelated eogruids, geranoidids, gastornithiforms, and dromornithids (mihirungs or "demon ducks"), and the plotopterids.

Ratites

 Ostriches 
 Common ostrich, Struthio camelus
 Somali ostrich, Struthio molybdophanes
 Asian ostrich, Struthio asiaticus †
 Emus
 Emu, Dromaius novaehollandiae
 King Island emu, Dromaius (novaehollandiae) minor †
 Kangaroo Island emu, Dromaius (novaehollandiae) baudinianus †
 Tasmanian emu, Dromaius novaehollandiae diemenensis †
 Cassowaries
 Dwarf cassowary, Casuarius bennetti
 Southern cassowary, Casuarius casuarius
 Northern cassowary, Casuarius unappendiculatus
 Moa (Dinornithiformes) †, several species
 Elephant birds (Aepyornithiformes) †, several species
 Kiwis
 Southern brown kiwi, Apteryx australis
 Great spotted kiwi, Apteryx haastii
 North Island brown kiwi, Apteryx mantelli
 Little spotted kiwi, Apteryx owenii
 Okarito kiwi, Apteryx rowi
 Rheas
 Greater rhea, Rhea americana
 Lesser rhea, Rhea pennata

Galliformes (game birds)
 New Caledonian giant scrubfowl, Sylviornis neocaledoniae †
 Noble megapode, Megavitornis altirostris †
 Viti Levu scrubfowl, Megapodius amissus †

Anseriformes (waterfowl)

 Auckland Island teal, Anas aucklandica
 Campbell teal, Anas nesiotis
 Steamer ducks
 Fuegian steamer duck, Tachyeres pteneres
 Falkland steamer duck, Tachyeres brachypterus
 Chubut steamer duck, Tachyeres leucocephalus
 Amsterdam wigeon, Anas marecula †
 Bermuda flightless duck, Anas pachyscelus †
 Finsch's duck, Chenonetta finschi †
 Moa-nalo †
 Turtle-jawed moa-nalo, Chelychelynechen quassus †
 Small-billed moa-nalo, Ptaiochen pau †
 O'ahu moa-nalo, Thambetochen xanion †
 Maui Nui large-billed moa-nalo, Thambetochen chauliodous † 
 Nēnē-nui, Branta hylobadistes † (possibly flightless or very weak flier)
 Giant Hawaiʻi goose, Branta rhuax †
 Mihirung, Genyornis newtoni †
 California flightless sea-duck or Law's diving goose, Chendytes lawi †
 Kaua'i mole duck, Talpanas lippa †
 New Zealand geese, Cnemiornis gracilis and C. calcitrans †

Aegotheliformes (owlet-nightjars)
 New Zealand owlet-nightjar, Aegotheles novaezealandiae †

Mesitornithiformes (mesites)
 Brown mesite Mesitornis unicolor (possibly flightless, has not been seen flying)

Columbiformes (pigeons, doves)

 Dodo, Raphus cucullatus †
 Rodrigues solitaire, Pezophaps solitaria †
 Viti Levu giant pigeon, Natunaornis gigoura †
 Saint Helena dove, Dysmoropelia dekarchiskos †
 Henderson ground dove, Gallicolumba leonpascoi †

Gruiformes (cranes, rails, and coots)

 Cuban flightless crane, Grus cubensis †
 Red rail, Aphanapteryx bonasia †
 Rodrigues rail, Erythromachus leguati †
 Woodford's rail, Nesoclopeus woodfordi (most likely flightless)
 Bar-winged rail, Nesoclopeus poecilopterus † (probably flightless)
 Weka, Gallirallus australis
 New Caledonian rail, Gallirallus lafresnayanus (likely †)
 Lord Howe woodhen, Gallirallus sylvestris
 Calayan rail, Gallirallus calayanensis
 Pink-legged rail, Gallirallus insignis
 Guam rail, Gallirallus owstoni
 Roviana rail, Gallirallus rovianae (flightless, or almost so)
 Tahiti rail, Gallirallus pacificus †
 Dieffenbach's rail, Gallirallus dieffenbachii †
 Wake Island rail, Gallirallus wakensis †
 numerous other unnamed Gallirallus rails from various Pacific islands
 Chatham rail, Cabalus modestus †
 Snoring rail, Aramidopsis plateni
 Invisible rail, Habroptila wallacii
 New Guinea flightless rail, Megacrex inepta
 Aldabra (white-throated) rail, Dryolimnas (cuvieri) aldabranus
 Réunion rail, Dryolimnas augusti †
 Sauzier's wood rail or Cheke's wood rail, Dryolimnas chekei †
 Inaccessible Island rail, Atlantisia rogersi
 Saint Helena rail, Aphanocrex podarces †
 Ascension crake, Mundia elpenor †
 Saint Helena crake, Porzana astrictocarpus †
 Laysan rail, Porzana palmeri †
 Hawaiian rail, Porzana sandwichensis †
 Small Maui crake, Porzana keplerorum †
 Liliput crake, Porzana menehune †
 Great Oʻahu crake, Porzana ralphorum †
 Great Maui crake, Porzana severnsi †
 Small Oʻahu crake, Porzana ziegleri †
 Kosrae crake, Porzana monasa †
 Henderson crake, Porzana atra
 Mangaia crake, Porzana rua †
 Tahiti crake, Porzana nigra †
 numerous other unnamed Porzana crakes from various Pacific islands
 Lord Howe swamphen, Porphyrio albus †
 North Island takahē, Porphyrio mantelli †
 Takahē, Porphyrio hochstetteri
 Samoan woodhen, Gallinula pacifica
 Makira woodhen, Gallinula silvestris
 Tristan moorhen, Gallinula nesiotis †
 Gough Island moorhen, Gallinula comeri
 Tasmanian native hen, Tribonyx mortierii
 Giant coot, Fulica gigantea (adults only; immature birds can fly)
 Hawkins' rail, Diaphorapteryx hawkinsi †
 Snipe-rail, Capellirallus karamu †
 Antillean cave rail, Nesotrochis debooyi †
 Hispaniolan cave rail, Nesotrochis steganinos †
 Cuban cave rail, Nesotrochis picapicensis †
 Adzebills, Aptornis otidiformis and A. defossor †

Podicipediformes (grebes)

 Junín grebe, Podiceps taczanowskii
 Titicaca grebe, Rollandia microptera
 Atitlán grebe, Podilymbus gigas † (reportedly flightless)

Charadriiformes (shorebirds and allies)
 Great auk, Pinguinus impennis †

Sphenisciformes (penguins)

 Emperor penguin, Aptenodytes forsteri
 King penguin, Aptenodytes patagonicus
 Adélie penguin, Pygoscelis adeliae
 Chinstrap penguin, Pygoscelis antarctica
 Gentoo penguin, Pygoscelis papua
 Little blue penguin, Eudyptula minor
 Magellanic penguin, Spheniscus magellanicus
 Humboldt penguin, Spheniscus humboldti
 Galapagos penguin, Spheniscus mendiculus
 African penguin, Spheniscus demersus
 Yellow-eyed penguin, Megadyptes antipodes
 Waitaha penguin, Megadyptes waitaha †
 Fiordland penguin, Eudyptes pachyrhynchus
 Snares penguin, Eudyptes robustus
 Erect-crested penguin, Eudyptes sclateri
 Northern rockhopper penguin, Eudyptes moseleyi
 Southern rockhopper penguin, Eudyptes chrysocome
 Royal penguin, Eudyptes schlegeli
 Macaroni penguin, Eudyptes chrysolophus
 Chatham penguin, Eudyptes warhami †

Suliformes (boobies, cormorants and allies)

 Flightless cormorant, Nannopterum harrisi

Pelecaniformes (pelicans, herons, ibises and allies)
 Ascension night heron, Nycticorax olsoni †
Jamaican ibis, Xenicibis xymphithecus †
Hawaiian flightless ibises, Apteribis glenos and A. brevis †

Strigiformes (owls)
 Cuban giant owl, Ornimegalonyx spp. † (possibly flightless)
 Cretan owl, Athene cretensis † (probably flightless)
 Andros Island barn owl, Tyto pollens † (possibly flightless)

Coraciiformes (kingfishers and allies)
 Saint Helena hoopoe, Upupa antaios †

Falconiformes (falcons and caracaras)
 Jamaican caracara, Caracara tellustris †

Psittaciformes (parrots)

 Kakapo, Strigops habroptilus

Passeriformes (perching birds)
 Lyall's wren, Xenicus lyalli †
 Long-billed wren, Dendroscansor decurvirostris †
 North Island stout-legged wren, Pachyplichas jagmi †
 South Island stout-legged wren, Pachyplichas yaldwyni †
 some Scytalopus tapaculos (possibly flightless, never seen flying)
 Long-legged bunting, Emberiza alcoveri †

References

External links
 TerraNature pages on New Zealand flightless birds
 Kiwi in Te Ara – the Encyclopedia of New Zealand